Zelyony Sad is a rural locality (a settlement) in Solodnikovsky Selsoviet, Chernoyarsky District, Astrakhan Oblast, Russia. The population was 59 as of 2010.

Geography 
Zelyony Sad is located 81 km northwest of Chyorny Yar (the district's administrative centre) by road. Solodniki is the nearest rural locality.

References 

Rural localities in Chernoyarsky District